A mambele is a form of hybrid knife/axe in central and southern Africa, originating from a curved throwing dagger used by the Mangbetu.

Description

The mambele consists of an iron blade with a curved back section and rearward spike. It can be used in close combat as a hatchet or dagger, or more typically as a throwing weapon. It usually consists of four blades, three on top and one on the side. The curved hook was used to keep the weapon in the victim, and if pulled out, caused further damage. It would have been about 22 inches in length. These African iron weapons are thrown with a rotatory motion, and can inflict deep wounds with their projecting blades.

The mambele is also known as:
hunga munga
danisco by the Marghi
goleyo by the Musgum
njiga by the Bagirmi
kpinga by the Zande. They were classed as "Court Metal", being produced under the patronage of the Avongara clan, distributed only to  professional warriors, and considered status symbols. It was also part of the dowry that a man must pay to the bride's family. Soldiers would carry three or four into battle, hidden behind their shields. They were typically thrown at the enemy from 30 feet away.

They vary constantly in form and their use extends across Africa, from the Upper Nile on the east through Central Africa and over to Gabon in West Africa. In parts of Central Africa these weapons assume the form of a bird's head.

These knives reflect the culture of Africa before western colonisation, both through their design and use. They can be symmetrical, bulbous, or even multi-pronged. Many are made of rarer and softer materials. These were harder to forge and were a status symbol to their owners.

See also
 Tomahawk

References

External links 
 Poppe, Guido T. Collection of mambeles, Belgium

Blade weapons
Throwing axes
Axes
African weapons
Daggers